Hassan Shamaizadeh (also Romanized as Hasan-é Šamâ'izâde; born January 15, 1943, in Isfahan) is an Iranian pop singer, songwriter and saxophonist. Over the past three decades, he composed songs for artists like Googoosh, Dariush, Moein, Ebi, Aref, Homeyra, Farhad and others.

Career 

At the age of 13, Shamaizadeh already played in a theater orchestra isfahan. He then played in the Radio programs and Television in Tehran. He is noted for playing Persian music with quarter tones on the saxophone, which is a rare skill.

In the 1960's, he was one of the first members of the popular Persian band Black Cats and played the saxophone for them.

He continued to break record with artists like "Aghaaghi" from 1976. He was selected as the most popular male artist in 1976 by readers of the magazine Zan-e Rooz.

Discography

 1973 - Mordaab ( "Maarsh")
 1973 - Safar ( "Journey")
 1973 - Naraftan Moondan - 45rpm single (Lavi Records)
 1974 - Ojagh ( "Four") b/w Hobab - 45rpm single (Caspian Records)
 1974 - Esm-eh To ( "Your name") b/w Gharib-e Ashenaa - 45rpm single (Caspian Records)
 1974 - Hamoomi b/w Kalakat(instrumental) - 45 rpm single (Ahang Rooz Records)
 1975 - Benevis ("Write") b/w Seda - 45rpm single (Ahang Rooz Records)
 1975 - Deh ( "Village") / Chel Cheleh - 45 rpm single (Ahang Rooz Records)
 1975 - Aghigh ("Jewel") / Sojdegah - 45rpm single (Ahang Rooz Records)
 1975 - Gol-E Naz-E Par Pare Man - (Cassette-only release) 
 1976 - bad az to ( "After You")
 1976 - Aghaghi ( "You are a jewel")
 1977 - Bumi
 1977 - Talaaye Kaaghazi (With Paajuki)
 1978 - Mehmuni ( "Party")
 1980 - Avaz-e Parvaaz ( "Flight Song")
 1981 - Gol Aftab Gardoon
 1982 - Golhayeh khis
 1984 - Bishtar Bishtar
 1985 - Kamtar Kamtar ( "Fewer")
 1985 - Kooch (With Homeyra )
 1986 - Dokhtar-e Mardom
 1987 - Ghasalak
 1988 - Hafteh Shab
 1988 - Zende Bad Eshgh
 1990 - Gol Yadeh1, Yadeh2
 1992 - Atash Rooyeh Khakestar
 1993 - Ye Dokhtar Daram Shah Nadareh
 1994 - Bolooreh Mahtab
 1996 - Akhareen Savaar ( "Last knight")
 1997 - Parvaz Eshgh-o
 1998 - Parastesh ( "Adoration")
 2001 - Morvarid ( "Pearl")
 2002 - Dooshizeh Khaanum ( "madam")
 2006 - Singer not the Song
 2012 - Hayahoo (Digital-only Single)
 2018 - Mosalase Khatereha (The Memory Makers) (ft. Googoosh)
 2018 - ghafas
2018 - Tanhaei
2020 - Aghaze Parvaz

References

External links 

 
Shamaizadeh's biography

1943 births
Living people
Iranian exiles
Iranian composers
Iranian pop singers
Iranian songwriters
People from Isfahan
Iranian male singers
Musicians from Isfahan
Persian-language singers
Iranian record producers
Iranian film score composers
20th-century Iranian male singers